The Canton of Beaumont-Hague in France is situated in the department of Manche and the region of Basse-Normandie. Its seat was the commune of Beaumont-Hague. It had 11,932 inhabitants (2012). It was disbanded following the French canton reorganisation which came into effect in March 2015. It consisted of 19 communes, which joined the new canton of La Hague in 2015.

The canton comprised the following communes:

Acqueville
Auderville
Beaumont-Hague
Biville
Branville-Hague
Digulleville
Éculleville
Flottemanville-Hague
Gréville-Hague
Herqueville
Jobourg
Omonville-la-Petite
Omonville-la-Rogue
Sainte-Croix-Hague
Saint-Germain-des-Vaux
Tonneville
Urville-Nacqueville
Vasteville
Vauville

References

Beaumont-Hague
2015 disestablishments in France
States and territories disestablished in 2015